Semmalainathar  Temple is a Siva temple in Keezhaiyur in Nagapattinam district in Tamil Nadu (India).

Vaippu Sthalam
It is one of the shrines of the Vaippu Sthalams sung by Tamil Saivite Nayanar Sundarar.

Presiding deity
The presiding deity is Semmalainathar. The Goddess is known as Vandamarum Poonguzhalal.

Location
In inscriptions this place is known as 'Arumozhi Deva Valanattu Alanattu Keezhaiyur'. It is located next to Karunganni in Nagapattinam-Thiruthuraipoondi road.

References

Hindu temples in Nagapattinam district
Shiva temples in Nagapattinam district